Greg Brady may refer to:
Greg Brady (broadcaster) (born 1971), Canadian broadcaster 
Greg Brady (Brady Bunch), a character from The Brady Bunch